Ali Ghaffari (1925–2007) was an Iranian wrestler. He competed in the men's freestyle lightweight at the 1948 Summer Olympics.

References

External links
 

1925 births
2007 deaths
Iranian male sport wrestlers
Olympic wrestlers of Iran
Wrestlers at the 1948 Summer Olympics
Place of birth missing